Following is a list of lines of miniatures, produced by various companies for use with role-playing games, or for figure painting.

References

Miniature figures